Union Pacific Depot or variations such as Union Pacific Station or Union Pacific Railroad Depot may refer to:

in the United States

Greeley Union Pacific Railroad Depot, Greeley, listed on the NRHP in Weld County, Colorado
Union Pacific Railroad Julesburg Depot, Julesburg, listed on the NRHP in Sedgwick County, Colorado
Sterling Union Pacific Railroad Depot, Sterling, listed on the NRHP in Logan County, Colorado 
Boise Union Pacific Depot, Boise, Idaho
--*Abilene Union Pacific Railroad Freight Depot, on Cedar Street in Abilene, listed on the NRHP in Dickinson County, Kansas
Union Pacific Railroad Depot (Concordia, Kansas), listed on the NRHP
Union Pacific Railroad Depot (Solomon, Kansas), listed on the National Register of Historic Places in Dickinson County, Kansas
Union Pacific Railroad Passenger Depot, Topeka, Shawnee County, Kansas
Union Pacific Railroad Depot (Eureka, Utah), listed on the National Register of Historic Places in Juab County, Utah
Union Pacific Railroad Depot (Milford, Utah); see Desert Wind
Morgan Union Pacific Depot, Morgan, Utah
Salt Lake City Union Pacific Depot or Salt Lake Union Pacific Railroad Station, Salt Lake City, listed on the NRHP in Salt Lake County, Utah
Cheyenne Depot Museum or Union Pacific Railroad Depot (Cheyenne, Wyoming), listed on the National Register of Historic Places in Laramie County, Wyoming
Union Pacific Railroad Complex (Evanston, Wyoming), listed on the NRHP
Medicine Bow Union Pacific Depot, Medicine Bow, Wyoming, listed on the NRHP
Union Pacific Railroad Depot (Rawlins, Wyoming), listed on the NRHP
South Torrington Union Pacific Depot, South Torrington, Wyoming, listed on the NRHP
South Torrington Union Pacific Depot, Torrington, Wyoming

The Depot (disambiguation)
Medicine Bow Union Pacific Depot, Medicine Bow, Wyoming

See also
Union Station (disambiguation)
Central Station (disambiguation)